Mustapha Belkhodja (born 16 April 1938) is a Tunisian former tennis player.

Belkhodja was the boys' singles champion at the 1956 French Championships and had to beat Rod Laver to win the title. In 1961 he reached the men's singles third round of the Wimbledon Championships, defeating two British players en route. He registered career wins over Clark Graebner (in 1962) and John Newcombe (in 1963).

References

External links
 

1938 births
Living people
Tunisian male tennis players
French Championships junior (tennis) champions
Grand Slam (tennis) champions in boys' singles
African Games medalists in tennis
African Games gold medalists for Tunisia
Competitors at the 1965 All-Africa Games